Boyd Glenn Perry (March 21, 1914 – June 29, 1990) was an infielder in Major League Baseball. He played for the Detroit Tigers.

References

External links

1914 births
1990 deaths
Major League Baseball infielders
Detroit Tigers players
Baseball players from North Carolina
People from Snow Camp, North Carolina